Geneviève Lalonde (born September 5, 1991) is a Canadian middle- and long-distance runner competing primarily in the 3000 metres steeplechase. Her biggest success to date is winning the gold medal at the 2019 Pan American Games. Lalonde won the bronze medal as a competitor for New Brunswick at the 2013 Jeux de la Francophonie in Nice, France. She also won the gold medal for New Brunswick at the 2013 Canada Summer Games in Sherbrooke, Quebec in the 2,000 m steeplechase. Lalonde holds the Canadian record in the 3,000 m steeplechase.

In July 2016, she was officially named to Canada's Olympic team. On August 13, 2016, she qualified for the women's 3000m steeplechase final with a personal best and new Canadian record of 9:30.24.

On August 11, 2017, she finished 13th in the Women's 3000 meters steeplechase finals at the 2017 World Championships in Athletics in London lowering the Canadian record once again to 9:29.99. On May 18, 2019, she placed 7th at the Shanghai Golden Grand Prix  with a time of 9:29.82, again lowering the national record.

Competition record

Personal bests

Outdoor

Indoor

References

External links
 
 

1991 births
Living people
Athletes from Montreal
Sportspeople from Moncton
Athletes (track and field) at the 2018 Commonwealth Games
Athletes (track and field) at the 2015 Pan American Games
Athletes (track and field) at the 2019 Pan American Games
Athletes (track and field) at the 2016 Summer Olympics
Canadian female long-distance runners
Canadian female middle-distance runners
Canadian female steeplechase runners
Olympic track and field athletes of Canada
Pan American Games bronze medalists for Canada
Pan American Games track and field athletes for Canada
Pan American Games gold medalists for Canada
Pan American Games gold medalists in athletics (track and field)
Pan American Games medalists in athletics (track and field)
World Athletics Championships athletes for Canada
Medalists at the 2015 Pan American Games
Medalists at the 2019 Pan American Games
Commonwealth Games competitors for Canada
Athletes (track and field) at the 2020 Summer Olympics
20th-century Canadian women
21st-century Canadian women